Ariane Herde (born 18 December 1979, Iserlohn) is a German-born, Dutch slalom canoeist who competed from the late 1990s to the late 2000s. She finished sixth in the K-1 event at the 2008 Summer Olympics in Beijing.

References
Sports-Reference.com profile

1979 births
Living people
Dutch female canoeists
Canoeists at the 2008 Summer Olympics
Olympic canoeists of the Netherlands
People from Iserlohn
Sportspeople from Arnsberg (region)
20th-century Dutch women
21st-century Dutch women